A throne is a seat of state for a potentate or dignitary.

Throne or Thrones may also mean:

People
Throne (surname)

Arts and entertainment
The Throne (group), collaboration pseudonym for rappers Jay Z and Kanye West (as on Drake's "Pop Style")
Thrones (band), a solo project of bassist Joe Preston
"Throne" (song), a single from the 2015 album That's the Spirit by Bring Me the Horizon
"The Throne", a song by Blind Guardian on their 2015 album Beyond the Red Mirror
The Throne (film), a 2015 South Korean film
The Throne, a poem by Carol Ann Duffy that was written for the 60th anniversary of Queen Elizabeth II's coronation

Other uses
Throne (angel), a rank of angels in Christianity
Throne, Alberta, Canada, an unincorporated community
Tsinghua Throne, an unmanned aerial vehicle built by Tsinghua University

See also

